West Norwood railway station is in the London Borough of Lambeth in West Norwood, South London. The station, and all trains serving it, are operated by Southern, and it lies in Travelcard Zone 3. Services from Platform 1 go to London Victoria and London Bridge via . Services from Platform 2 operate to more varied destinations, including West Croydon and London Bridge via .

It is located in West Norwood above Norwood High Street, and has its main entrance on the A215 road, which here is called Knights Hill. The station saw some modernisation in summer 2009, with ticket gates installed and the entrance to the eastbound platform refurbished. From spring 2010 the gates have been staffed from first to last train.

History
The station was opened as Lower Norwood on 1 December 1856, as part of the West End of London and Crystal Palace Railway. It was renamed on 1 January 1886 by the London, Brighton and South Coast Railway (LBSCR), owing to the objections of an influx of new residents who objected to the "lower" prefix; they preferred the locale to be described instead as West Norwood.

They used an AC overhead wire system developed by the LBSCR as part of their Elevated Electric scheme. This system was replaced by the current third rail DC system on 3 March 1929.

The original station buildings were demolished in 1969, and replaced with prefabricated CLASP buildings.

Service
All services at West Norwood are operated by Southern using  EMUs.

The typical off-peak service in trains per hour is:
 4 tph to 
 2 tph to 
 2 tph to 

During the evenings, the services between London Victoria and West Croydon do not run and the services between London Bridge and Beckenham Junction are reduced to hourly.

On Sundays, the services between London Bridge and Beckenham Junction do not run.

Gallery

References

External links

Railway stations in the London Borough of Lambeth
Former London, Brighton and South Coast Railway stations
Railway stations in Great Britain opened in 1856
Railway stations served by Govia Thameslink Railway